Japanese singer-songwriter Seiko Matsuda has released fifty-five studio albums, forty-one compilation albums, six soundtracks, two remix albums, one extended plays, and eight box sets.

Seiko released her debut album, Squall in August 1980; it peaked at number two in Japan and has sold over 500,000 copies. The second single from the album, "Aoi Sangoshō" became the fifteenth best-selling single of 1980 in Japan. Her second album, North Wind, was released later in the year and became Matsuda's first number one album. One of her best-selling and critically acclaimed albums, Pineapple was released in 1982. The album peaked at number one in Japan and spawned two number one singles. In 1983, Matsuda released her most successful studio album to date, Utopia, which became the third best-selling album of the year in Japan. Her first English-language album, Sound of My Heart was released in 1985. The album was produced by Phil Ramone and peaked at number two in Japan. Her fifteenth studio album, Citron, which was produced by David Foster, was released in 1988 and became Matsuda's twelfth number one studio album.

Matsuda's global debut album, Seiko was released in 1990. The album has spawned a hit single, "The Right Combination". The single, which features the guest vocals by American singer Donnie Wahlberg, reached top 20 in Australia and Canada, as well as charting in Japan, the United States, and the United Kingdom. Matsuda's eleventh compilation album, Bible was released in 1991 and has been certified double platinum by the Recording Industry Association of Japan. In 1996, Matsuda released her twenty-seventh studio album, Vanity Fair. The album spawned her best-selling single, "Anata ni Aitakute: Missing You", and peaked at number two in Japan. Her third global album, Area 62 was released in 2002. The album has spawned two Billboard Dance Club Songs top twenty singles. Matsuda released the compilation album, We Love Seiko: 35th Anniversary Seiko Matsuda Kyūkyoku All-Time Best 50 Songs, which became her first top three album in 19 years. Her first jazz album, Seiko Jazz was released in 2017 through Verve Records and peaked at number six in Japan.

Matsuda is one of the best-selling music artists in Japan, having sold over 30 million records nationwide.

Studio albums

Reissues

Compilation albums

Soundtrack albums

Remix albums

Extended plays

Tribute albums

Box sets

Footnotes

See also
 List of best-selling albums in Japan

References

External links

Pop music discographies
Discographies of Japanese artists